Moorside Edge transmitting station, opened in 1931, was originally constructed to radiate the BBC's North Regional (from 17 May on 626 kHz) and National Programmes (from 12 July on 995 kHz).

It is – at 200 kW – one of the most powerful mediumwave radio transmitters in Britain. Formed of two 158-metre-high steel lattice towers, it is located just above Moorside Edge. Other nearby transmitting stations are Holme Moss (11.56 km, bearing 168.17°) and Emley Moor (15.4 km, bearing 99.41°).

As with most mediumwave transmitters, a good "signal earth" is important and this is assured by the waterlogged nature of the ground on which it is built. The site's location on the Pennine Hills means that signals from Moorside Edge can be received at very long distances: as far north as Scotland, as far south as the Midlands, as far west as Dublin, and well beyond the country's eastern (North Sea) coast.

The station is now owned and operated by Arqiva and broadcasts the following services:

Formerly:

See also
List of masts
List of radio stations in the United Kingdom

References

External links
 Info and pictures of the Moorside Edge transmitter.
 The Transmission Gallery: Moorside Edge Transmitter photographs and information

Buildings and structures in Kirklees
Mass media in Yorkshire
Radio in the United Kingdom
Transmitter sites in England